The 2009–10 season was Darlington Football Club's 81st season in the Football League and their 18th consecutive season in the fourth tier of English football, Football League Two. It covered the period from 1 July 2009 to 30 June 2010.

The season began with the club in administration, from which it exited just in time for the team to compete in the League Two season. After four matches they were bottom of the table, and bottom they remained for the rest of the season, with relegation to the Conference confirmed with six matches still to play. Three first-team managers took charge during the playing season, and there were two further managerial resignations and appointments during June 2010. The team lost in the first round of both the FA Cup and the League Cup and in the second round of the Football League Trophy.

Background and summary
In February 2009, Darlington F.C. chairman George Houghton had placed the club into administration, which obliged the Football League to impose a 10-point deduction. The team finished the 2008–09 season in 12th place in League Two, only seven points below the promotion play-off places. Despite closing the west stand at the Darlington Arena to cut costs, and fund-raising projects, which included a match between the club's 1999-2000 play-off team and an All-Stars team featuring former Darlington players Bernie Slaven and Marco Gabbiadini under the captaincy of former England international midfielder Paul Gascoigne that attracted a crowd of over 3,000, no buyer for the club was found by a 5 May deadline. The "majority of the first-team squad" were made available on free transfers, and assistant manager Martin Gray and most of the coaching staff and administrative staff were laid off. Craig Liddle and Neil Maddison took caretaker charge of the team.

On 20 May, Houghton returned as owner and chairman; he appointed former Middlesbrough manager Colin Todd as manager, and issued a statement confirming he was "not going to let the club die" so would continue funding until a buyer was found. Shortly afterwards, a deal was agreed such that Raj Singh would becom chairman with full control of club and stadium and he and Houghton would each own half of the surrounding land. Darlington exited administration on 7 August, with approval from the Football League to participate in the 2009–10 League Two season. On 3 August, 13 players were officially registered, several of whom had been with the club in 2008–09; a further 4 arrived before the end of the month.

The team gained only two points from the first nine matches, and Todd left on 26 September. He and the chairman disagreed as to whose idea his departure was. After two matches with Liddle as caretakerboth defeats former Republic of Ireland manager Steve Staunton took over until the end of the season, with Kevin Richardson as his assistant.

In early December it emerged that a dispute had arisen over a clause in the contract of captain Steve Foster, the club's highest-paid player. Foster had shown loyalty to the club by accepting a pay cut with a clause that guaranteed him the offer of a contract extension if he made 20 appearances during the season. With two matches to go, Staunton confirmed that Foster would not be selected unless he rescinded that clausethe club's financial state precluded making that sort of offer when they might not even be in the Football League next seasonand underlined his resolve by naming Ian Miller as captain. Although both parties wanted the situation resolved, Foster stood his ground and was released at the end of February having made 19 appearances in 2009–10.

In the January transfer window, Staunton brought in several Irish players on temporary or short-term deals, including St Patrick's Athletic midfielder Gary Dempsey, former Shamrock Rovers striker Tadhg Purcell, teenage defender Simon Madden, and former Inverness Caledonian Thistle defender Richie Byrne. He also signed former Darlington defender Alan White on loan, and youngsters Gareth Waite, a midfielder from Spennymoor Town, and former Hibernian striker Patrick Deane on six-month deals.

The team had been bottom of the league since the fourth match of the season, and attendances were falling. The loss at home to Barnet on 20 March attracted a record low crowd of 1,463 and left the team 19 points from safety. Feeling there was no alternative, Singh sacked Staunton the next day, recognising that "a lot of fans voted with their feet"the attendance record fell to 1,296 at the next matchand he needed to appoint a manager to prepare for a promotion season in the Conference. Former Barnsley manager and Darlington player Simon Davey was appointed on 1 April, and despite two wins in his first four matches, relegation was confirmed on 13 April with six matches still to play. For the final fixture, he selected three youth-team players in the starting eleven and used a fourth, the 16-year-old Jordan Marshall, as a second-half substitute.

Having begun to build a squad for the coming season, Davey quit on 16 June. His assistant, Ryan Kidd, signed a two-year contract before having second thoughts, and Mark Cooper, who had been Singh's first choice to replace Staunton, signed a one-year deal on 29 June.

League table (part)

Match results

General source: Match content not verifiable from these sources is referenced individually.

FA Cup

Football League Cup

Football League Trophy

Appearances and goals
Source:
Numbers in parentheses denote appearances as substitute.
Players with name and squad number struck through and marked  left the club during the playing season.
Players with names in italics and marked * were on loan from another club for the whole of their season with Darlington.
Players listed with no appearances have been in the matchday squad but only as unused substitutes.
Key to positions: GK – Goalkeeper; DF – Defender; MF – Midfielder; FW – Forward

Transfers

In
The Football League approved the club's exit from administration only in August 2009, so although deals had been agreed with a number of players, some of whom had appeared in pre-season matches, these players were not officially registered until 3 August 2009. These registrations also included those of players whose contracts could not be renewed until the club came out of administration.

Loans in

Out

Loans out

See also
2009–10 in English football

Notes

References

Darlington F.C. seasons
Darlington